The Defence Minister of Armenia is the head of the country's Ministry of Defence, who is charged with the political leadership of the Armed Forces of Armenia. The position was originally created in 1918 and was re-established in January 1992 following Armenia's independence from the USSR, and is currently headed by Suren Papikyan. From 1993 to 1995, there was a concurrent position called the State Minister for Defence held by Vazgen Sargsyan.

List of ministers

First Republic of Armenia (1918–1920)

Armenian SSR (1920–1991)

Third Armenian Republic (1991–present)

See also
Ministry of Defence of Armenia
Armed Forces of Armenia

References 

Government ministries of Armenia
Defence
Defence ministers of Armenia